Caldicoprobacter oshimai  is a Gram-positive, extremely thermophilic, anaerobic, xylanolytic and non-motile bacterium from the genus of Caldicoprobacter which has been isolated from faeces of sheep from the farm at the University of Georgia in the United States.

References

 

Eubacteriales
Bacteria described in 2010
Thermophiles